Kitiona Tausi (born December 1954) is a Tuvaluan politician. Tausi was elected to the Parliament of Tuvalu in the 2022 by-election to represent the Nanumanga electorate. He was appointed Deputy Prime Minister & Minister for Fisheries and Trade in the Natano Ministry to succeed Minute Alapati Taupo.

Career 
Tausi trained in theology and was appointed as a priest of Tuvalu's main church, Ekalesia Kelisiano Tuvalu, and acted as the General Secretary of the organisation. From January 2011 until his retirement he was a parish minister at the Vaialofa Vaiaku Church on Funafuti. Following his retirement, he was appointed as a chaplain to Fetuvalu Secondary School.

Following his retirement as a parish minister, on 28 September 2020, he established the first private newspaper to operate in the country – Tuvalu Paradise News, and was editor of the print newspaper and website. The Tuvalu Paradise News was published until Tausi was appointed as a member of parliament.

He has been appointed to a number of Tuvaluan government and non-government organisations, including: Tuvalu Association of Non Government Organizations (TANGO), the Tuvalu National Private Sector Organisation (TNPSO), and prior to his election as a member of parliament he was the chairman of the Tuvalu Broadcasting Corporation (TVBC) board of directors.

References

1954 births
Living people
Deputy Prime Ministers of Tuvalu
Members of the Parliament of Tuvalu